Horné Pršany is a village and municipality of the Banská Bystrica District in the Banská Bystrica Region of Slovakia

History
In historical records, the village was first mentioned in  1407 (as Persen).

References

External links
http://www.horneprsany.sk

Villages and municipalities in Banská Bystrica District